Milda Valčiukaitė (born 24 May 1994) is a Lithuanian national representative rower, an Olympian and dual world champion. She won the women's double scull title alongside Ieva Adomavičiūtė at the 2018 World Rowing Championships in Plovdiv. She won gold medals at the 2013 World Rowing Championships and the 2013 European Rowing Championships and was a bronze medalist at the Rio 2016 Olympics.

Valčiukaitė is coached by Tomas Valčiukas, and was a two time world junior champion with Ieva Adomavičiūtė. In 2013, Valčiukaitė started to compete with Donata Vištartaitė. She currently studies Business Information management in Vilnius University.

Personal life 
Valčiukaitė is engaged to another Lithuanian rower Saulius Ritter.

References

External links
 
 
 
 

Lithuanian female rowers
1994 births
Living people
Sportspeople from Vilnius
World Rowing Championships medalists for Lithuania
Lithuanian Sportsperson of the Year winners
Olympic bronze medalists for Lithuania
Olympic medalists in rowing
Olympic rowers of Lithuania
Medalists at the 2016 Summer Olympics
Rowers at the 2016 Summer Olympics
Rowers at the 2020 Summer Olympics
Universiade gold medalists for Lithuania
Universiade medalists in rowing
European Rowing Championships medalists
Medalists at the 2013 Summer Universiade
Medalists at the 2015 Summer Universiade